The Sweden women's national basketball team represents Sweden in international women's basketball competition and is controlled by the Swedish Basketball Federation. The national team has entered five EuroBasket Women finals, the first in 1978 where they lost all of their matches and finished in 13th place. At the EuroBasket Women 1987 Sweden finished in 7th place, a feat repeated in 2013.  In 2019 Sweden reached the quarter-finals and was ranked 5th, a result that secured a spot in the 2020 Olympic qualifying tournament.

Comparing with earlier decades, Sweden improved significantly during the 2010s.  This was much thanks to the "Golden Generation" who won medals in junior championships on both European and World levels.

Competitive record

EuroBasket Women

Team

Current roster
Roster for FIBA Women's EuroBasket 2021.

|}
| valign="top" |
 Head coach
 Marco Crespi
 Assistant coaches
 Viktor Bengtsson
 Mats Levin

Legend
Club – describes lastclub before the tournament
Age – describes ageon 17 June 2021
|}

See also
Sweden women's national under-18 basketball team
Sweden women's national under-16 basketball team

References

External links
 
FIBA profile
Sweden National Team – Women at Eurobasket.com

 
 
Women's national basketball teams